Louisa Reeve (born 16 May 1984 in London) is a British rower who competed at the 2008 Summer Olympics and 2012 Summer Olympics.

Rowing career
Along with Olivia Whitlam she finished 6th in the women's coxless pair at the 2008 Summer Olympics. She also rowed in the finals in the Women's eight which finished fifth.

She was part of the British squad that topped the medal table at the 2011 World Rowing Championships in Bled, where she won a bronze medal as part of the eight with Alison Knowles, Jo Cook, Jessica Eddie, Natasha Page, Lindsey Maguire, Katie Greves, Victoria Thornley and Caroline O'Connor.

At the 2012 Summer Olympics, she rowed in the women's eight.

On 19 April 2015 Jessica Eddie and Reeve finished second in women's pair at the British rowing trials at Caversham, behind Helen Glover and Heather Stanning. They were followed by Katie Greves & Zoe Lee.

References

External links
 
 

1984 births
Living people
English female rowers
British female rowers
Rowers from Greater London
Rowers at the 2008 Summer Olympics
Rowers at the 2012 Summer Olympics
Olympic rowers of Great Britain
Alumni of Hatfield College, Durham
Members of Leander Club
World Rowing Championships medalists for Great Britain
Durham University Boat Club rowers
European Rowing Championships medalists